Delinski Glacier is a glacier flowing south into Wright Upper Glacier between the McAllister Hills and Prentice Plateau, Victoria Land. It was named by the Advisory Committee on Antarctic Names (2004) after George F. Delinski, Jr., Geography Discipline, U.S. Geological Survey (USGS), cartographic technician in the preparation of USGS maps of Antarctica, 1966–2004.

References

Glaciers of Victoria Land
Scott Coast